State Route 697 (SR 697, OH 697) is an east–west state highway in the western portion of Ohio, a U.S. state. The eastern terminus of this route is located on the northern fringe of downtown Delphos, following a nearly  concurrency with State Route 66 at a signalized intersection that doubles as the southern terminus of State Route 190.

Route description
This state highway runs through the eastern portion of Van Wert County, and into the extreme northwestern corner of Allen County.  State Route 697 is not a part of the National Highway System.

History
State Route 697 was established in 1938 along the routing that it utilizes to this day.  No changes of major significance have taken place to the highway throughout its history.

Major intersections

References

697
Transportation in Van Wert County, Ohio
Transportation in Allen County, Ohio